Kadyrovo (Qaźir) is a rural locality (a village) in Volostnovsky Selsoviet, Kugarchinsky District, Bashkortostan, Russia. The population was 127 as of 2010. There are 2 streets.

Geography 
Kadyrovo is located 34 km northwest of Mrakovo (the district's administrative centre) by road. Tyulyabayevo is the nearest rural locality.

References 

Rural localities in Kugarchinsky District